Sebastián Ignacio Vegas Orellana (born 4 December 1996) is a Chilean professional footballer who plays as a defender for Liga MX club Monterrey and the Chile national team.

International career
Along with Chile U20, he won the L'Alcúdia Tournament in 2015.

Vegas got his first call up to the senior Chile squad for a friendly against the United States in January 2015.

International goals
As of match played on 26 March 2021. Scores and results list Chile's goal tally first.

Honours

Monterrey
 Copa MX: 2019–20
 CONCACAF Champions League: 2021

Chile U20
 L'Alcúdia International Tournament (1): 2015

Chile
 China Cup: 2017

Individual
 CONCACAF Champions League Team of the Tournament: 2021

Notes

References

External links

1996 births
Living people
Footballers from Santiago
Association football defenders
Chilean footballers
Chilean expatriate footballers
Chile under-20 international footballers
Chile youth international footballers
Chile international footballers
Audax Italiano footballers
Atlético Morelia players
Mazatlán F.C. footballers
C.F. Monterrey players
Chilean Primera División players
Segunda División Profesional de Chile players
Liga MX players
Expatriate footballers in Mexico
Chilean expatriate sportspeople in Mexico
Chilean expatriates in Mexico
2015 South American Youth Football Championship players
2021 Copa América players